Brus or de Brus is a surname with multiple origins. Notable people include:

Brus 
 Antonín Brus z Mohelnice (1518–1580), Czech archbishop
 Brady Brus, American meteorologist
 Günter Brus (born 1938), Austrian artist
 Harry Brus (born 1949), Australian musician
 Helena Wolińska-Brus (1919–2008), Polish military prosecutor
 Louis E. Brus (born 1943), American chemistry professor
 Shaul Brus (1919–2008), Polish rabbi
 Sven Brus (born 1941), Swedish politician
 Włodzimierz Brus (1921–2007), Polish economist

de Brus 
Various members of the Scottish House of Bruce:
 Alexander de Brus (1285–1307), younger brother of King Robert I of Scotland
 Alexander de Brus, Earl of Carrick (died 1333)
 Edward de Brus (c. 1280 – 1318)
 Isabella de Brus (1272–1358), Queen consort of Norway
 Nigel de Brus (c. 1279 – 1306)
 Robert de Brus (1274–1329)
 Robert de Brus, 1st Lord of Annandale (c. 1070 – 1141)
 Robert de Brus, 2nd Lord of Annandale (died c. 1194)
 Robert III de Brus, oldest son of the above
 Robert de Brus, 4th Lord of Annandale (c. 1195 – 1245)
 Robert de Brus, 5th Lord of Annandale (c. 1215 – 1295)
 Robert de Brus, 6th Lord of Annandale (1243–1304)
 Thomas de Brus (c. 1284 – 1307)
 William de Brus, 3rd Lord of Annandale (died 1212)

See also
 

Czech-language surnames
Polish-language surnames
Surnames of French origin